Penicillium tealii is a species of fungus in the genus Penicillium. It was discovered at Rowlands Creek near Uki in far northeastern New South Wales in April 2021 on the body of a dead spider. Citizen scientist Donovan Teal accidentally discovered the fungus while collecting samples of insect-eating fungi and it was subsequently named after him.

References

tealii
Fungi described in 2022